The Obotrites or Obodrites, also spelled Abodrites, were a confederation of medieval West Slavic tribes within the territory of modern Mecklenburg and Holstein in northern Germany (see Polabian Slavs). For decades, they were allies of Charlemagne in his wars against the Germanic Saxons and the Slavic Veleti. The Obotrites under Prince Thrasco defeated the Saxons in the Battle of Bornhöved (798). The still heathen Saxons were dispersed by the emperor, and the part of their former land in Holstein north of Elbe was awarded to the Obotrites in 804, as a reward for their victory. This however was soon reverted through an invasion of the Danes. The Obotrite regnal style was abolished in 1167, when Pribislav was restored to power by Duke Henry the Lion, as Prince of Mecklenburg, thereby founding the German House of Mecklenburg.

Obotritic confederation
The Bavarian Geographer, an anonymous medieval document compiled in Regensburg in 830, contains a list of the tribes in Central Eastern Europe to the east of the Elbe. The list includes the Nortabtrezi (Obotrites) - with 53 civitates.
Adam of Bremen referred to them as the Reregi because of their lucrative trade emporium Reric. In common with other Slavic groups, they were often described by Germanic sources as Wends.

The main tribes of the Obotritic confederation were:

the Obotrites proper (Wismar Bay to Lake Schwerin);
the Wagrians (the eastern Holstein as part of Saxony);
the Warnower (the upper Warnow and Mildenitz);
the Polabians proper (between the Trave and the Elbe).

Other tribes associated with the confederation include:
the Linonen near Lenzen,
the Travnjane near the Trave,
the Drevani in the Hanoverian Wendland.

History

As allies of the Carolingian kings and the empire of their Ottonian successors, the Obotrites fought from 808 to 1200 against the kings of Denmark, who wished to rule the Baltic region independently of the empire. When opportunities arose, for instance upon the death of an emperor, they would seek to seize power; and in 983 Hamburg was destroyed by the Obotrites under their king, Mstivoj. At times they levied tribute from the Danes and Saxons. Under the leadership of Niklot, they resisted a Christian assault during the Wendish Crusade.

German missionaries such as Vicelinus converted the Obotrites to Christianity. In 1170 they acknowledged the suzerainty of the Holy Roman Empire, leading to Germanisation and assimilation over the following centuries. However, up to the late 15th century most villagers in the Obotritic area were still speaking Slavic dialects (Polabian language), although subsequently their language was displaced by German. The Polabian language survived until the beginning of the 19th century in Hanoverian Wendland, eastern Lower Saxony (bordering modern Mecklenburg-Western Pomerania).
The ruling clan of the Obotrites kept its power throughout the Germanisation and ruled their country (except during a short interruption in Thirty Years' War) as House of Mecklenburg until the end of monarchies in Germany in November Revolution 1918. Previously, the Obodrites were dominated by the Naconids; Eastern (Far) Pomerania was ruled by the Pomeranian House (Grifichi).

List of Obotrite leaders

The rulers of Obotrite lands were later the dukes and grand dukes of Mecklenburg.

See also
List of Medieval Slavic tribes
Praedenecenti

Notes

References

Literature

Turasiewicz A., Dzieje polityczne Obodrzyców od IX wieku do utraty niepodległości w latach 1160 - 1164, Warszawa 2004,

External links

Emperor Charles the Great in 804 gave Saxon land to Obodrites, dispersed Saxons

 
Former confederations
States and territories established in the 8th century
States and territories disestablished in the 1160s